Sjællandske Medier is a regional Danish media company with activities on the island of Zealand (outside Copenhagen) and headquarters in Ringsted, Denmark. It publishes the newspapers Dagbladet, Frederiksborg amtsavis and Sjællandkse as well as a number of local weekly publications and has also activities in local radio and television, advertisement and book publishing.

History
The modern company originates from the merger of Næstved Tidende and Sjællandske Tidende in 1986. The company A/S Sjællandske Dagblade was established in 1990. Today Sjællandske Medier A/S houses Dagbladet, Sjællandske, Frederiksborg Amts Avis and Nordvestnyt.

Operations
Sjællandske Medier is headquartered in Ringsted. The company has editorial offices in 28 cities on Zealand with the ones in Hillerød, Roskilde, Greve, Køge, Ringsted, Holbæk, Kalundborg, Slagelse, Næstved and Vordingborg as the largest .

Activities

Websites
sn.dk witch covers Zeeland with local news except the capital city of Copenhagen
vdonline.dk a local website covering Slagelse, Korsør and Skælskør
Byportalerne.dk - local news and stories

Newspapers
 Dagbladet
 Nordvestnyt
 Frederiksborg Amtsavis
 Sjællandske

Weekly publications
Sjællandske Medier publishes 34 free weeklies with a combined weekly circulation of 785,000 and another 245,000 every fortnight on Zealand and Møn.

They are published in Hillerød, Roskilde, Greve, Køge, Store Heddinge, Fakse, Haslev, Ringsted, Borup, Tølløse, Holbæk, Jyderup, Nykøbing Sjælland, Asnæs, Kalundborg, Høng, Slagelse, Næstved, Vordingborg, Stege and Nykøbing Falster.

Radio and TV
Sjællanske Medier operates the local radio stations Radio SLR and Radio Køge and produces local television in 24 Produktion.

Advertisement
Sjællandske Medier operates the advertisement agencies Sjællandske Medier/Holst Reklamebureau in Næstved and RA Reklame in Roskilde.

Printing
The company has Rotary printing press activities in Ringsted, Holbæk and Vordingborg/Ørslev as well as a book printing house in Tølløse.

Websites
sn.dk witch covers Zeeland with local news except the capital city of Copenhagen
vdonline.dk a local website covering Slagelse, Korsør and Skælskør
Byportalerne.dk - local news and stories

Newspapers
 Dagbladet
 Nordvestnyt
 Frederiksborg Amtsavis
 Sjællandske

Weekly publications
Sjællandske Medier publishes 34 free weeklies with a combined weekly circulation of 785,000 and another 245,000 every fortnight on Zealand and Møn.

They are published in Hillerød, Roskilde, Greve, Køge, Store Heddinge, Fakse, Haslev, Ringsted, Borup, Tølløse, Holbæk, Jyderup, Nykøbing Sjælland, Asnæs, Kalundborg, Høng, Slagelse, Næstved, Vordingborg, Stege and Nykøbing Falster.

Radio and TV
Sjællanske Medier operates the local radio stations Radio SLR and Radio Køge and produces local television in 24 Produktion.

Advertisement
Sjællandske Medier operates the advertisement agencies Sjællandske Medier/Holst Reklamebureau in Næstved and RA Reklame in Roskilde.

Printing
The company has Rotary printing press activities in Ringsted, Holbæk and Vordingborg/Ørslev as well as a book printing house in Tølløse.

See also
 Roskilde Avis

References

External links
 sn.dk

Mass media companies of Denmark
Companies based in Ringsted Municipality
Danish companies established in 1990